The 1972 Czechoslovak Figure Skating Championships was held on December 18–19, 1971 in Karvina. Medals were awarded in the disciplines of men's singles, ladies' singles, pair skating, and ice dancing.

Results

Men

Ladies

Pairs

Ice dancing

Sources
 Rude Pravo Archiv, 20.12.1971, Page 6

Czechoslovak Figure Skating Championships